Bozhidar Lukarski (born 23 June 1972 in Pernik) is a Bulgarian politician and lawyer. He was the leader of Union of Democratic Forces from 2013 to 2018. Since November 7, 2014 he is the Minister of Economy in the Second Borisov Cabinet.

References

1972 births
Living people
People from Pernik
21st-century Bulgarian lawyers
Bulgarian conservatives
Government ministers of Bulgaria
Union of Democratic Forces (Bulgaria) politicians